Collette Cooper is a British singer/songwriter and actor from Manchester and lives in London.

Career 
Collette Cooper is a singer/songwriter currently working on her debut album, City of Sin, and has completed several music videos,  Big Fat Liar and Bonkers. Collette performs in London and has performed at several fashion, charity and awards shows including Samuel L. Jackson One For the Boys karaoke benefit in collaboration with GQ on 25 September 2014  and The Gang Show at the Groucho Club on 4 October 2014 in support of Teenage Cancer Trust.

Collette is also an actor and has worked in theatre and film with the likes of Jane Campion, Michael Winterbottom and Samantha Morton.  She plays Magdalen in the feature film Set the Thames on Fire by Ben Charles Edwards - a singer - along with Noel Fielding and Sally Phillips and performs two of her own tracks.

She does work on Nick Grimshaw’s Breakfast Show and has rerecorded the novelty song Selfie with Scarlett Johansson for BBC Radio.

Personal life 
Collette is an avid netball player and played with the England girls' netball team against the Radio1 Male DJs for a BBC comedy Commonwealth Games sketch in July 2014.

Collette cycled to Paris from London to raise money for cancer.

Discography 
City of Sin (Due out in 2015)

Music videos
Big Fat Liar
Bonkers

Filmography 
An Angel at My Table (1990)
Gold: The World's Play (TV Movie) (1991)
Gold: The Merchants of Venus (TV Movie) (1991)
Gold: The Dynamiters (TV Movie) (1991)
Gold: Frenchie's Gold (TV Movie) (1991)
Gold: A Fistful of Gold (TV Movie) (1991)
Playing the Field (TV Series) (1998-2000)
24 Hour Party People (2002)
Coronation Street (TV Series) (2002)
Nice Guy Eddie (TV Series) (2002)
Doctors (TV Series) (2002)
Casualty (TV Series) (2003) - credited as Colette Cooper
The Courtroom (TV Series) (2004)
Bipolar (Short) (2006)
Murder in Mind (2009)
The Unloved (TV Movie) (2009)
Miss Mia Meows (Short) (2012)
Flim: The Movie (2014) - Screened at the 2014 Raindance Festival in London
Room 55 (Short) (2014) - Completed
Set the Thames on Fire (2015) - Post Production

References

External links 

Living people
British actresses
Year of birth missing (living people)
Musicians from London
Musicians from Manchester